Glaiza Castro Galura-Rainey (born January 21, 1988), professionally known by her stage name Glaiza de Castro, is a Filipino actress, recording artist and advocate. She is recognized as the industry's "Drama Royalty" for her acting prowess and versatility.

Regarded as an acclaimed actress, she won "Best Actress" at the 37th Film Academy of the Philippines Luna Awards. She has also earned multiple nominations at the prestigious FAMAS Awards & Gawad Urian Awards. In 2016, de Castro won her first acting award as the "Teleserye Actress of the Year" at the 3rd PEP List Awards. In 2017, she was honored with a Gawad Filipino's Media People's Choice Award for being an advocate for women's rights. The following year, de Castro has once again won "Best Actress in a TV Series" at the 8th EdukCircle Awards. In 2019, she bagged another "Best Film Actress" award at the 5th Platinum Stallion Media Awards. 

In 2021, she received the "Best Film Award" for her movie “Midnight in a Perfect World” in Italy, which also became the top-selling film of QCinema International Film Festival. As a recording artist, she has released four studio albums with "Synthesis" achieving Gold certification from PARI, becoming the first artist under Homework Music to achieve this. She is best known for her performances in Stairway to Heaven, Temptation of Wife, Contessa and Encantadia.

Acting career

Early career: minor roles on television and in movies (2002–2006) 

De Castro began her career with GMA Network playing a minor role in the soap opera Ikaw Lang Ang Mamahalin. However, after only a few months with the company, she transferred to rival network ABS-CBN and became a contract artist of Star Magic, the company's training ground for young talent. During her time in ABS-CBN, she continued to play both supporting and minor roles, two of the most prominent being the role of Halley in the teen-oriented show, Berks.

Between 2002 and 2005, she would only appear in films sporadically, playing bit parts in movies such as Singsing ni Lola (2002) and Miss Pinoy (2005). By 2006, she began to appear in films more frequently, with minor parts in the horror films Sukob and White Lady, as well as the Manny Pacquiao biographical film, Pacquiao: The Movie. Her most prominent film role during this point in her career was in the film adaptation of Carlo Vergara's graphic novel, Zsazsa Zaturnnah; the film was an entry to the 2006 Metro Manila Film Festival.

Return to GMA Network and breakout roles (2006–2008) 

After four years with ABS-CBN, de Castro returned to her home network, GMA Network in 2006. One of her first roles back was as Honey on the fantasy-adventure series, Fantastikids, where she starred alongside Marky Cielo, Jackie Rice and Ryza Cenon, as well as former child star Paolo Contis and former beauty queen Melanie Marquez. The reception to the show was mostly warm; journalist Paul Daza of The Philippine Daily Inquirer compared it favorably to its counterpart on ABS-CBN (fantasy-drama anthology Komiks), and commented that, based on ratings, "it would seem like the new [GMA-7] stars are outshining the more established [ABS-CBN] performers." At this time, she also performed regularly on GMA's regular Sunday variety show, SOP Rules.

In 2007, De Castro appeared in the afternoon teen drama Boys Nxt Door. The series has been dubbed in Malay on the Malaysian channel 8TV and became the first Filipino drama to air in South Korea, via KBS2. The second role was in the 2007 action-adventure series, Asian Treasures, GMA-7's most expensive show to date. De Castro played Clara, an expert on history and geography who would use this knowledge to help the main characters find the titular treasures.

2007 also saw her featured prominently in the independent film Still Life, a film written and directed by Katski Flores, about an artist stricken with a terminal illness who has traveled to an isolated island to paint his last work. In the film, de Castro plays Emma, a woman who relates her past to the main character. Her portrayal of Emma was noted by film critic Tito Valiente of Business Mirror as "one reason the short life on that island becomes very real." Valiente went on to note that de Castro's character was "vulnerable but not whiny. Even in tears she conjures an image of a woman whose only way out of life is finding life in anything." The film was a finalist at that year's Cinemalaya Philippine Independent Film Festival, where De Castro received a Golden Screen Awards nomination in the Best Actress category. She also played a supporting role that year in the romantic film Batanes, alongside top GMA actress Iza Calzado, Taiwanese singer-actor Ken Chu, and Marky Cielo. The following year, 2008, she started shooting another independent film, Rakenrol. The film is based on director Quark Henares' views on growing up in the local rock scene, as well as his own personal experiences in starting a band. De Castro described the film, which was still in production as of March 2009, as "a lighter version of Almost Famous and "a fun, feel-good movie".

In 2008, she played the lead role in the television adaptation of the 1991 film, Kaputol ng Isang Awit. In the series, De Castro played Sarah Monteza a poor girl with a good voice but low self-esteem. De Castro herself would later go on to say that the role was her "biggest break" thus far.

Career resurgence (2009–present) 
After another supporting role in the television adaptation of comic-book writer Carlo J. Caparas' graphic novel Gagambino, De Castro once again landed a lead role on another television adaptation of a Filipino film, Kung Aagawin Mo ang Lahat sa Akin opposite Patrick Garcia, Maxene Magalona, Jackie Rice and JC Tiuseco. In the series she played Gladys Andrada (a role originated by co-star Jackie Lou Blanco), the jealous, only biological child of Gilbert (played by Nonie Buencamino) and Clara Andrada (played by Blanco). Her portrayal was well-received; columnist Jason John Lim commented that while she knew she was breaking out of her comfort zone, "What she didn't know that she would also begin breaking the expectations of everybody."

Right after Kung Aagawin Mo ang Lahat sa Akin, she played another supporting role on an episode of the drama anthology SRO Cinemaserye, which chronicled the life story of singer Eva Castillo (portrayed in this episode by Manilyn Reynes). Shortly thereafter, she landed another role in the Philippine remake of the widely popular Korean television drama, Stairway to Heaven, alongside Dingdong Dantes, Rhian Ramos and TJ Trinidad. She portrayed Eunice Manansala (serving as the counterpart for Han Yoori, played by actress Kim Tae-hee), the envious stepsister of Jodi Reyes (played by Rhian Ramos). To prepare for the role, de Castro watched the original series in order to attempt to get an idea of who her character was as a person. De Castro also commented on the relative complexity of her character in this series compared to her character in Kung Aagawin Mo Ang Lahat Sa Akin: "Unlike my previous role, you don't know what is going on inside the mind of Eunice. What's going inside her head is really devious. She is subtle in her approach and very scheming... Despite being evil, she still has a heart and there's a reason she became a bad person. If she is stepping down on people, she is also being stepped on by other people. She also has to fulfill her needs and wants and she will do everything for the person she loves." As with her two previous major roles, her portrayal was also well received by critics; Jerry Donato of The Philippine Star, in particular, has gone so far to say that "So far, Glaiza has given her Korean counterpart a run for her money."

In 2009, de Castro appeared in five films. In the first, the independent political thriller Benteshe replaced former StarStruck contestant and fellow GMA star Jewel Mische when the latter refused to film a sex scene she considered "beyond [her] moral standards" as directed by Mel Chionglo. The film was released in June 2009 and received mixed reviews, with Rito Asilo of the Philippine Daily Inquirer citing its thematic substance and Gomez's and Calzado's "insightful performances", while also going on to blast the film's "disparate stories", "incohesive feel and style", and sudden ending "in a convenient anticlimax".

The second film was the horror movie Tarot, released on August 26. The film, about a girl who is able to predict the future through the use of tarot cards, was directed by Jun Lana and was top-billed by Marian Rivera and Dennis Trillo.

A third film, Ang Manghuhula, was released commercially in September (it had been shown at the Cinemanila International Film Festival the previous year). The film was directed by Paolo Herras and saw de Castro playing the daughter of Messina (played by Eula Valdez), a seer. The production was received warmly, with Noelani Torre of the Philippine Daily Inquirer noting its "fascinating subject matter", "colorful cast" and "visual richness and clarity".

The fourth film de Castro starred in that year was the independent film Astig (international title: Squalor) alongside Sid Lucero, Edgar Allan Guzman, Arnold Reyes and Dennis Trillo (who also directed the film). In Astig, de Castro playing Elgine, a teenager afflicted with a sexually transmitted disease who eventually becomes the love interest of Trillo's character. The film, released in July of that year, was a critical and financial success, topping the box office in that year's Cinemalaya Film Festival, with a profit of P137,890.00. Darwin Chiong of GMANews.tv called the film's cinematography "remarkable" and praised the cast as a whole, saying, "The movie gathers an ensemble of actors that deliver in the acting department, even those in supporting roles like Glaiza de Castro and Malou Crisologo." Her performance in this film earned her a nomination in the Best Supporting Actress Category at the 33rd Gawad Urian Awards.

The fifth film was the sixth film under the Mano Po banner, subtitled A Mother's Love. The film, directed by Joel Lamangan and top-billed by Sharon Cuneta, Zsa Zsa Padilla, Heart Evangelista and Dennis Trillo, saw de Castro playing a younger version of Cuneta's character, Melinda Uy. The film was released on December 25 and was an entry to that year's annual Metro Manila Film Festival.

Her first project on GMA for 2010 was in another villain role in what was billed as the Philippines' first musical, comedy-drama series, Diva, which debuted on GMA Network on March 1, 2010 and ended on July 30 of that year. The show, which also starred Regine Velasquez, Mark Anthony Fernandez, TJ Trinidad and singer Jaya and is partly based on the American movie trilogy High School Musical and the American television series Glee, saw de Castro playing the ambitious Tiffany, who is Lady's (Rufa Mae Quinto) assistant and soon-to-be a villainess to singer-actress Regine Velasquez's heroine Melody.

After Diva, de Castro auditioned for and won the title role on the primetime fantasy series Grazilda. The show, a sequel to the Cinderella story, centers on Grazilda, who is in turn based on one of Cinderella's wicked stepsisters, Drizella. The plot revolves around Grazilda's banishment from her home world of Fantasia to the human world, where she suffers a fate similar to Cinderella's. The series, which premiered on September 13, 2010, also stars Geoff Eigenmann, Yasmien Kurdi, Jolina Magdangal and Cherie Gil, and marks de Castro's first lead role in a primetime series. Prior to the show's debut, the actress was constantly quoted as being unable to believe her success; she had by then been accustomed to playing only villainous roles and expected to do so for the remainder of her career. The show was both a critical and commercial success, beating its rival show 1DOL by a margin of five points in the AGB Mega Manila ratings. In light of the show's success, de Castro's manager, Manny Valera, has decided to turn down any further villain roles on behalf of his talent in order to build her up as a lead star.

On October 30, it was announced that de Castro would no longer be cast in the remake of the film Temptation Island and would instead be launched as a lead star in the 2011 remake of the 1992 film Aswang, produced by Regal Films with film director Topel Lee. But her lead role went to Lovi Poe instead. De Castro later played the major role in an epic drama Amaya, opposite Marian Rivera and Sid Lucero.

In 2012, de Castro first appear on Tweets for My Sweet playing the role of Kimberly, the long lost daughter and a sister to Meg which is portrayed by Marian Rivera and on the 3rd Quarter of the year she was chosen to be cast on the Philippine adaptation of Temptation of Wife, playing the role of Heidi which is originally by Alessandra de Rossi when she declined the role.

In 2013, de Castro will co-star Vampire Ang Daddy Ko which is top billed by Vic Sotto and Oyo Boy Sotto.

In 2015, another major role has landed to de Castro's career. She played the role of Althea Guevarra in the hit TV lesbian series, "The Rich Man's Daughter" alongside Rhian Ramos

In 2016, she played the role of Pirena in the hit Telefantasya, "Encantadia" originally by Sunshine Dizon. In 2017, she reprised the role in the series Mulawin vs. Ravena.

In March 2018, she took on the title role in the revenge series Contessa.

Other works 
In March 2016, de Castro was part of UN Women's Safe Cities Program, a program that aims to increase the awareness and stop street harassment and sexual violence against women in public spaces. As part of the program, de Castro was part of Quezon City's campaign against sexual harassment.

Music 
De Castro has so far released four albums. The first one, titled Magbalik Ka, was released under XAX Music Entertainment, in 2001, when she was thirteen. Five years later, she released a second album, the self-entitled Glaiza, this time released under Dyna Records. The latter album, described by de Castro herself as "more defined" compared to her first album, comprises pop and R&B songs, and contains mostly original content except for three tracks: a cover of Joey Albert's song "How Can I Make You See", as well as a Tagalog version (titled "Paano"), and an English version of Dingdong Avanzado's "Basta't Kasama Kita". When asked why it took her half a decade to release a second album, De Castro explained that after the first album was completed, she did not renew her contract with the record company and instead focused on her television career. In June 2008, Glaiza was officially launched, two years after the album was released.

In 2015, de Castro launched her third, self-produced album Synthesis. She did mall shows to promote this album. It was her most successful album so far.

In 2017, de Castro released her fourth album under PolyEast Records titled Magandang Simulain. After its release, de Castro mounted a concert to promote the songs under this album. The concert was held at the Music Museum.

De Castro received critical acclaim for her in-character covers of the Asin songs "Himig ng Pag-ibig" and "Pagbabalik" when she played anti-dictatorship activist Cecilia Flores-Oebanda in the 2018 film Liway. Moviegoers were noted to be so emotional during the film that they often clapped in the cinemas after being moved by de Castro's performance, both in terms of acting and in performing the songs.

Public image 
Despite gaining wider recognition for her roles as a villain in Kung Aagawin Mo Ang Lahat Sa Akin and Stairway to Heaven, de Castro has reportedly had qualms about portraying a villain again in future projects. Of this, she commented, "I don't want to be typecast as an antagonist forever because it's difficult to get rid of that sort of image." However, she has expressed preference for antagonist roles over "sexy" roles. She later retracted this statement, saying that she "didn't think [she'd] get typecast because [she] plays different kinds of women each time" and explained this by saying, "The stories are different, so [her] characters' [motivations] are also different."

Although she had, in the past, considered posing for magazines such as FHM "for instant fame and fortune", she eventually decided against it and opted to hone her craft as a serious actress, saying, "I just want to start on the right foot by focusing more on acting than diverting my attention to other interests. I want to become an actress and to show what I can do." She has also expressed interest in playing "out-of-the-box and extreme roles", in the vein of Natalie Portman in V for Vendetta and Charlize Theron in Monster. In 2008, she spoke of her preference for independent film, commenting in Taglish, "As for me, I feel fulfilled in indie films. I'm given roles in indie projects that are heavier compared to the mainstream. And I'm rarely offered roles in mainstream [films] anyway."

Advocacy and political positions 

De Castro is known as a Women’s Rights and Protection Advocate, having won a Media People's Choice Award for her advocacy in 2017.

After performing the role of anti-Marcos activist Cecilia Flores-Oebanda in 2018, de Castro has spoken against historical negationism regarding the Philippines' martial law era, which was the setting of the film. She agreed that it was a polarizing topic, but said that Filipino youth need to be "made more aware of it, because it's important to know history and learn from it. It's necessary for everyone's growth." In 2020, she participated in activities denouncing the then newly-signed Anti-Terrorism Act of 2020, joining numerous artists in reciting Charlie Chaplin's final speech in the film The Great Dictator, as translated into Filipino by writer Rody Vera.

Personal life 
She also maintained a close friendship with consistent on-screen partner Marky Cielo for a significant part of the latter's career until his death in 2008. In the wake of her friend's death, de Castro recounted an exchange she had the day before Cielo died: she told Cielo about a dream she had about him and Rich Asuncion; according to her, Cielo had other people tell him they had dreams about him, which he took to be an omen of death.

Filmography

Film

Television

Discography

Albums
Magbalik Ka (2001)
Glaiza (2006)
Synthesis (2015)
Magandang Simulain (2017)

Synthesis soundtrack
 "Dusk 'til Dawn"
 "Sayo Pa Rin"
 "Country Tree"
 "Waiting Shed"
 "Pag-ikot"
 "Makaturok"
 "Barcelona"
 "Memo"

Magandang Simulain soundtrack
 "Ganti"
 "Itanong Mo sa Mga Bata"
 "Dukha"
 "London"
 "Bato sa Buhangin"
 "Sinta"
 "Ang Himig Natin"
 "Magandang Simulain"

Singles

Concerts

Poetry books

Awards and nominations

References

External links

Sparkle GMA Artist Center profile

1988 births
Living people
Filipino child actresses
GMA Network personalities
ABS-CBN personalities
Star Magic
Filipino Christians
Filipino evangelicals
Filipino film actresses
Filipino television actresses
Filipino Pentecostals
Filipino Protestants
Actresses from Metro Manila
People from Valenzuela, Metro Manila
21st-century Filipino actresses
21st-century Filipino women singers
Filipino television variety show hosts
Participants in Philippine reality television series